Roger Baxter (1784–1827) was an English Jesuit, a Catholic missionary in the United States, and Prefect of Studies at Georgetown College.

Life
Baxter was a native of Walton-le-Dale, near Preston, in Lancashire and studied at Stonyhurst College. He entered the Society of Jesus in 1810. In 1816, in response to a letter of Rev. T.C. Holland, Baxter wrote a letter printed in the Preston Chroncile in defense of the Trinity.

Baxter arrived in Georgetown in early 1817 bearing a letter of introduction from Charles Plowden,  Rector of Stonyhurst and head of the English Province of Jesuits, to Giovanni Antonio Grassi, superior of the Jesuits' Maryland Mission and the president of Georgetown College. He was ordained shortly after his arrival by Archbishop Neale on 31 May 1817. 

Between May 9 to Dec. 1, 1817, a theological controversy was carried on between Baxter and Rev. W.H. Wilmer, Episcopal minister of St. Paul's church, Alexandria, Virginia regarding the tenets of Catholicity. Baxter's letters were published in the Alexandria Gazette, and Wilmer's in the Alexandria Herald. Baxter is described as "a man conspicuous for his learning, eloquence, and zeal in defense of the faith". 

After occasionally visiting Richmond, Virginia in 1818, he became the resident priest there the following year. Most of the congregation were Irish immigrants who had come to work on the James River and Kanawha Canal. Known as an effective preacher, Baxter gave the address at the dedication of the Cathedral of the Assumption in Baltimore on 31 May 1821. 

After October 1819, he was at Georgetown College, where he served as Prefect of Studies and professor of philosophy until 1824. Baxter then spent a year in Europe. He severed his ties with the Society and stayed some time in England before returning. 

After rendering great services to the missions of Maryland and Pennsylvania, he died at St. Joseph's Residence in Philadelphia on 24 May 1827 at the age of thirty-four, and was buried in "The "Bishop's Ground" and in 1841 removed to Holy Cross Cemetery.

Works
 'Remarks on a Sermon preached by the Rev. J. Le Mesurier, B.D., in which the invocation of saints and angels, as now practised in the church of Rome, is attempted to be shown as idolatrous,’ Lond. 1816. 
 'The most important Tenets of Roman Catholics fairly explained,’ Washington, 1819, Philadelphia, 1845, often reprinted.
 Meditations For Every Day In The Year, (Roger Baxter S.J. ed.) New York, Benziger Brothers, 1823.

References

Attribution

1784 births
1827 deaths
19th-century English Jesuits
18th-century English people
People from Walton-le-Dale
Roman Catholic writers
English religious writers
19th-century English non-fiction writers
Roman Catholic missionaries in the United States
19th-century American writers
English Roman Catholic missionaries
British expatriates in the United States